Live at the O² Arena is a live album by Georgian-born British singer–songwriter Katie Melua. It was recorded on 8 November 2008 at The O2 Arena in London. The CD release of the album contains 19 tracks whereas the vinyl edition features a different track listing with three additional songs, namely "Thank You Stars", "Two Bare Feet" and "Spellbound". Those three tracks are also included in the digital download release of the album.

Track listing

CD and digital download
 "Piece by Piece" (Katie Melua) – 3:19
 "Lilac Wine" (James Shelton) – 4:08
 "Kviteli Potlebi (Yellow Leaves)" (Giya Kancheli, Gruzinski) – 2:54
 "My Aphrodisiac Is You" (Mike Batt) – 4:20
 "Crawling up a Hill" (Mayall) – 3:25
 "Mary Pickford (Used to Eat Roses)" (Batt) – 3:15
 "Blues in the Night" (Harold Arlen, Johnny Mercer) – 4:20
 "If You Were a Sailboat" (Batt) – 3:57
 "Ghost Town" (Melua, Batt) – 3:41
 "Perfect Circle" (Melua, Molly McQueen) – 7:12
 "Spider's Web" (Melua) – 3:58
 "Toy Collection" (Melua) – 3:15
 "Scary Films" (Batt) – 4:08
 "Mockingbird Song" (Batt) – 4:16
 "The Closest Thing to Crazy" (Batt) – 4:16
 "Nine Million Bicycles" (Batt) – 3:35
 "On the Road Again" (Floyd Jones, Alan Wilson) – 4:56
 "Kozmic Blues" (Janis Joplin, Gabriel Mekler) – 5:19
 "I Cried for You" (Melua) – 3:31
Digital download bonus tracks
"Thank You Stars" (Batt) – 3:49
"Two Bare Feet" (Melua, Batt) – 3:25
<LI>"Spellbound" (Melua) – 4:29

Vinyl LP
Side A (21:22 min.)
"Piece by Piece" (Melua) – 3:19
"Lilac Wine" (Shelton) – 4:07
"Kviteli Potlebi (Yellow Leaves)" (Kancheli, Gruzinski) – 2:54
"My Aphrodisiac Is You" (Batt) – 4:20
"Crawling up a Hill" (Mayall) – 3:25
"Mary Pickford (Used to Eat Roses)" (Batt) – 3:14

Side B (22:57 min.)
"Blues in the Night" (Arlen, Mercer) – 4:20
"If You Were a Sailboat" (Batt) – 3:57
"Ghost Town" (Melua, Batt) – 3:41
"Thank You Stars" (Batt) – 3:49
"Perfect Circle" (Melua, McQueen) – 7:12

Side C (23:38 min.)
"Two Bare Feet" (Melua, Batt) – 3:25
"Spider's Web" (Melua) – 3:58
"Toy Collection" (Melua) – 3:15
"Scary Films" (Batt) – 4:08
"Spellbound" (Melua) – 4:29
"Mockingbird Song" (Batt) – 4:15

Side D (21:40 min.)
"The Closest Thing to Crazy" (Batt) – 4:16
"Nine Million Bicycles" (Batt) – 3:35
"On the Road Again" (Jones, Wilson) – 4:56
"Kozmic Blues" (Joplin, Mekler) – 5:19
"I Cried for You" (Melua) – 3:31

Variants
In Portugal the album was released with a bonus CD of material originally recorded for Rádio Comercial, February 21, 2009, and entitled "Concerto mais pequeno do mundo" ("The smallest gig in  the world"):
 "If You Were a Sailboat"
 "Crawling up a Hill"
 "Nine Million Bicycles"
 "Dirty Dice"
 "Lilac Wine"

Chart performance

Peak positions

References

External links
Official website

Katie Melua albums
2009 live albums
Albums produced by Mike Batt